Mihajlo Andrić (born January 4, 1994) is a Serbian professional basketball player for MoraBanc Andorra of the LEB Oro.

Professional career
On 15 November 2013, Andrić played his first match in Euroleague against CSKA Moscow where he spend almost 12 minutes on the court. On 31 January 2014, against Lokomotiv Kuban, Andrić has played his best game of the season in the Euroleague Top 16 where he scored 8 points and enrolled 1 assist. In his second season with the team, first as a senior, he won the Basketball League of Serbia by defeating arch rivals Crvena zvezda with 3–1 in the final series. He left Partizan in July 2018.

Andrić played for Göttingen in Germany between 2018 and 2020. During the 2019–20 season, he averaged 6.9 points, 2.9 rebounds and 1.1 assists per game.

On 16 September 2020, Andrić signed with Kolossos Rodou of the Greek Basket League. In 18 games, he averaged a career-high of 12.9 points (shooting with 46.5% from the 3-point line), 3.9 rebounds and 1.8 assists per contest.

On August 24, 2021, Andrić signed with Afyon Belediye of the Turkish Basketbol Süper Ligi (BSL). In 10 games, he averaged 8.4 points, 3.1 rebounds and 2.2 assists per contest. 

On January 11, 2022, Andrić moved to Promitheas Patras of the Greek Basket League and the EuroCup for the rest of the season. In 22 league games, he averaged 7.8 points (shooting with 42.6% from the 3-point line), 2.6 rebounds and 1.2 assists, playing around 22 minutes per contest.

On August 21, 2022, he has signed with MoraBanc Andorra of the LEB Oro.

Serbian national team
Andrić played for Serbian national team at the 2013 FIBA Under-19 World Championship in Prague and won a silver medal. He averaged 8.0 points and 2.4 rebounds per game.

3x3 basketball
Andrić won gold medal at the 2012 FIBA 3x3 Under-18 World Championships representing Serbia national 3x3 under-18 team together with Luka Anđušić, Miloš Janković, and Rade Zagorac.

References

External links
 Mihajlo Andrić at aba-liga.com
 Mihajlo Andrić at euroleague.net
 Mihajlo Andrić at kkpartizan.rs
 Mihajlo Andrić at fiba.com
Mihajlo Andrić at  Afyon Belediyespor'a transfer oldu

1994 births
Living people
ABA League players
Afyonkarahisar Belediyespor players
Basketball League of Serbia players
BG Göttingen players
KK Partizan players
Kolossos Rodou B.C. players
Promitheas Patras B.C. players
Serbian expatriate basketball people in Germany
Serbian expatriate basketball people in Greece
Serbian expatriate basketball people in Turkey
Serbian men's 3x3 basketball players
Serbian men's basketball players
Shooting guards
Small forwards
Sportspeople from Kragujevac